Doktor Johannes Faust, Op. 47, is an opera in three acts by Hermann Reutter. The libretto was written by Ludwig Andersen, based on an old puppet play Doktor Faust on the Faust topic. The opera was premiered by the Oper Frankfurt at its house (now the Alte Oper) on 26 May 1936, staged by Walter Felsenstein. It was published by Schott. A revised version was first performed at the Staatstheater Stuttgart on 8 June 1955, conducted by Ferdinand Leitner.

History 
Reutter composed Doktor Johannes Faust as an opera in three acts and five scenes to a libretto which Ludwig Andersen based on an old puppet play Doktor Faust on the Faust topic, in a version by Karl Simrock. Andersen was the pen name of Ludwig Strecker, director and editor of the music publisher Schott-Verlag. Strecker published the opera for Schott, the libretto in 1935 and the score in 1936.

It was a success. The premiere in Austria was on 18 December 1940 at the Graz Opera, conducted by Karl Fischer, with Alfred Schütz as Mephisto. A revised version was presented at the Staatstheater Stuttgart on 8 June 1955, staged by Kurt Puhlmann and conducted by Ferdinand Leitner. This performance was recorded, with Bernd Heyer as Faust and Gustav Neidlinger as Mephisto.

Reutter tried to create a people's opera (Volksoper), similar to Werner Egk's Die Zaubergeige, which was also composed to a libretto by Andersen and published by Schott. The music is moderately progressive, using many dances. The opera, which takes about two hours to perform, is set in Mainz and Parma in the 16th century. It is one of many adaptations of the Faust topic.

Roles 
The roles and their voice types are, according to the publisher:

References

External links 

 
 

Operas
1936 operas
Operas based on plays
German-language operas
Works based on the Faust legend